Long Pond Ironworks State Park is located in the community of Hewitt, in West Milford, New Jersey, United States. The park is known for its old stone walls, furnaces and other remnants of a once industrious ironworking community that now sits next to the swiftly flowing Wanaque River.

Long Pond Ironworks Historic District

The ironworks were built in 1766 and were added to the National Register of Historic Places on January 11, 1974.

Long Pond Ironworks were founded in 1766 by Peter Hasenclever. Hasenclever brought 500 ironworkers and their families from Germany to build an ironworks "plantation". A dam at "Long Pond" (Greenwood Lake) provided the waterpower needed to operate a blast for the furnace and a large forge. The ironworks produced iron for the Continental Army, for the American forces in the War of 1812, and for the Union Army during the Civil War. Metalmaking stopped at the site in 1882 when the ironworks was bankrupted by newer facilities in Pittsburgh.

The remnants of the ironmaking structures at the district date from the 18th and 19th centuries. There are furnaces, casting house ruins, charging areas, ice houses, water wheels and other structures. The area is currently undergoing restoration. The "Old Country Store" has been renovated and now houses the Long Pond Ironworks Museum. The original Village of Hewitt grew up around the 19th-century iron enterprise. This settlement included a church, a store/post office, schoolhouses, and dwellings and outbuildings for workers and managers.

There are many structures in the vast area of Long Pond Ironworks. There are two main water wheels in fairly good conditions one water is fine the other one has been burnt by vandals. There is a big furnace named Lucy which exploded on natural causes, another furnace which will one day be fixed when the state gives money and two other minor furnaces you may find. There is an abandoned community which is still standing except for two buildings. It is possible to take a tour on an abandoned turnpike where much slag (the remaining rock from smelting iron) and charcoal are visible.

Monksville Reservoir

Known for its trophy size muskellunge, walleye, bass and trout, Monksville Reservoir, atop the defunct community of Monksville, New Jersey is used by anglers, sporting clubs and the US Sailing Association. Easily accessible from either the north or the south boat ramp, the area is open 24/7.

References

External links

Long Pond Ironworks Historic Site
Long Pond Ironworks State Park
 NY-NJTC: Long Pond Ironworks State Park Trail Details and Info

Ironworks and steel mills in the United States
Museums in Passaic County, New Jersey
Economy of New Jersey
Parks in Passaic County, New Jersey
State parks of New Jersey
Mining in New Jersey
Industry museums in New Jersey
Industrial buildings and structures in New Jersey
New Jersey Register of Historic Places
Defunct iron and steel mills
West Milford, New Jersey